Carex hostiana, the tawny sedge, is a species of flowering plant in the genus Carex, native to Europe and northeast Canada, and extinct in Massachusetts. It is a member of the Carex flava species complex.

Description

Taxonomy
The species was first formally described by the botanist Augustin Pyramus de Candolle in 1813 as a part of the work Catalogus Plantarum Horti Botanici Monspeliensis. It has three homotypic synonyms; Carex fulva, Trasus fulvus and Trasus hostianus and 13 heterotypic synonyms including; Carex armena, Carex biformis, Carex fulvescens and Carex subsalsa.

Distribution
In Europe the range of the species extends from Spain in the west to Ukraine in the east and from Italy and Greece in the south to as far north as Finland, Norway and sweden. In the Americas it is found in Quebec and Newfoundland in Canada.

See also
 List of Carex species

References

hostiana
Plants described in 1813
Taxa named by Augustin Pyramus de Candolle
Flora of Newfoundland
Flora of Austria
Flora of Ukraine
Flora of Belarus
Flora of Belgium
Flora of the Czech Republic
Flora of Denmark
Flora of Finland
Flora of France
Flora of Germany
Flora of Great Britain
Flora of Hungary
Flora of Ireland
Flora of Italy
Flora of the Netherlands
Flora of Norway
Flora of Poland
Flora of Quebec
Flora of Romania
Flora of Spain
Flora of Sweden
Flora of Switzerland
Flora of Slovakia